Farshad Ghasemi is an Iranian football player who currently plays for Saipa in the Persian Gulf Pro League.

Career

Persepolis
He trained with Persepolis for one week. He joined Persepolis on 11 July 2013. He played for Persepolis U21 in AFC Vision Asia U-21 Tehran Premier League. He made his debut for Persepolis in a match against Mes Kerman in week 18 of 2013–14 Iran Pro League. On 28 December 2014 he released from Persepolis.

Club career statistics

International career

Iran U–20
He was called up to the Iran U–20 team by Ali Doustimehr in November 2013.

Iran U–23
He was called up to the Iran U–23 team by Nelo Vingada in June 2014.

Honours
Persepolis
Iran Pro League: 2013–14 (Runner-up)

References

External links 
 Farshad Ghasemi at PersianLeague.com
 Farshad Ghasemi at IranLeague.ir

1993 births
Living people
Iranian footballers
Persepolis F.C. players
Association football defenders
Iran under-20 international footballers